I Do? I Die! (D'yos Ko Day!) is a 1997 Filipino comedy film directed by Efren Jarlego. Produced by Star Cinema, the film was released on April 16, 1997. Starring with Edu Manzano, Agot Isidro, Babalu, and Redford White.

Synopsis
Bernie (Edu Manzano), and Helena’s (Agot Isidro) marriage is about to dismantle. However, their witty and mischievous children Paolo (Paolo Contis), Paula (Paula Peralejo), Carlo (Carlo Aquino), and CJ (Ceejay Ramos) will not let it happen. In order to save their parents’ marriage and family, the children team-up with two hilarious factory workers Domeng (Babalu), and Mokong (Redford White). Will they succeed in letting their parents re-learn the value of acceptance and family?

Plot
Bernie and Helena had a dysfunctional marriage because of Bernie's playboy nature and Bernie's secretary was flirting with him. Domeng and Mokong were fired from their jobs where Bernie is the employer for doing rude acts accidentally and caught sleeping in the job due to overnight tasks assigned by their supervisor. They are trying to find a work in several jobs but unfortunately, Bernie is always the manager of every job they tried to apply including a construction firm and a country club even they are acting as blind beggars in the street. This further aggravated the situation, Domeng and Mokong have decided to seek revenge against Bernie for firing them in their jobs by robbing Bernie's house however when they tried to hide in the trunk of the car, someone locked them out. Then the car was driven by Bernie going to his vacation house in Baguio together with his secretary, unknown to them that Mokong and Domeng were inside the car trunk. Meanwhile, Bernie and Helena's marriage got worse while their kids tried to help them resolve the issue, they convinced Helena to follow Bernie in Baguio. When they arrived in their vacation house. Helena and her kids caught Bernie in the act having an affair with his secretary and confronted them. Bernie and Helena's siblings walked out of the house together with the keys of their house and vehicles, they will not give the keys and unlocked the house unless the two fixed their issue. Mokong and Domeng have finally escaped out of the car the assumed that Bernie's family left they entered Bernie's House unknowing to them that Bernie and Helena were inside the house and van they saw was their siblings driving the van and the two met the couple inside the house and confronting them. When Bernie and Helena were cornered, Mokong and Domeng started to rob the house and escape. Upon their robbery, Bernie and Helena marriage problems were finally resolved. While Bernie and Helena's children were driving to go home, they encounter Mokong and Domeng's vehicle, losing out of control and their van went to the edge of the cliff and getting to fall. One of them escaped out of the van and he saw Mokong and Domeng. The two went to the van and saved them, then Bernie arrived and help Domeng. All the children survived, the van fell off the cliff and explodes. As Bernie's sign of gratitude, he decided to return Mokong and Domeng to their jobs.

Cast
Edu Manzano as Bernardo "Bernie" Mendiola
Agot Isidro as Helena "Helen" Mendiola
Babalu as Domeng
Redford White as Mokong
Paolo Contis as Paolo Mendiola
Paula Peralejo as Paula Mendiola
Carlo Aquino as Carlo Mendiola
Ceejay Ramos as CJ Mendiola
Glydel Mercado as Carrie
Delia Razon as Mother of Helena
Marita Zobel as Mother of Bernie
Pocholo Montes as Father of Bernie
Malou Crisologo as Friend of Helena (as Malouh Crisologo)
Minnie Aguilar as Friend of Helena
Cheng Avellana as Friend of Helena
Rhoda Autajay as Friend of Helena
Jon Achaval as Priest (as John Achaval)
Leo Timones Jr. as Workout Buddy (uncredited)

External links

1997 films
1997 comedy films
Filipino-language films
Philippine comedy films
Star Cinema films
1990s Tagalog-language films